Maple Ridge Township is the name of some places in the U.S. state of Michigan:

 Maple Ridge Township, Alpena County, Michigan
 Maple Ridge Township, Delta County, Michigan

Michigan township disambiguation pages